"Good Times with Weapons" is the first episode of the eighth season of the American animated series South Park and the 112th episode of the series. It originally aired on March 17, 2004. In the episode, the boys are transformed into Japanese warriors after they buy martial arts weapons at a local market. Their sworn enemy, Professor Chaos, confronts them and a highly stylized battle ensues. The episode's animation routinely switches from the usual cutout-and-solid-color style to a highly stylized anime theme.

This was the first episode with April Stewart as the bulk of the female characters following Eliza Schneider's departure. The episode was written by series co-creator Trey Parker. In 2015, he and co-creator Matt Stone listed it as their second favorite episode of the series. The episode was rated TV-MA L in the United States.

Plot
At the Park County Fair, the boys find a man selling East Asian weapons. The vendor says he cannot sell weapons to them without their parents' approval, so they lie that their parents are dead, convincing the shopkeeper to give them the weapons. Stan purchases a pair of Tonfa, Kyle gets nunchaku, Cartman buys a pair of sai, and Kenny purchases a pair of shaken-style shuriken. After showing their weapons off to Craig, they go around town pretending to be ninjas, becoming anime-like characters with their own individual superpowers. The animation style takes on an overall Japanese look and switches to a cinemascope aspect ratio whenever this happens in the original print at 4:3.

Butters sees them playing and wants to join but the boys refuse to let him. He goes home and becomes his supervillain alter ego, Professor Chaos, and sets off to get his revenge on the four ninjas. Professor Chaos neutralizes Kyle and Stan, so Kenny comes to their defense and throws one of his shuriken. It hits Butters in his eye and becomes lodged in it, ending the boys' playtime. They realize that Butters needs medical attention, but taking him to the local hospital would result in their parents discovering their purchases. When an attempt to extract it from his eye fails, the boys decide to dress Butters up like a dog to get him treatment from a veterinarian.

On the way, the boys encounter Craig again and have to hide Butters in an abandoned oven so no-one sees him. Much to their chagrin, Craig has copied them and obtained weapons from the same vendor, enlisting Jimmy, Clyde, and Token as his fellow ninjas. The two ninja groups fight, but in the chaos Butters escapes. The four boys force Craig's group to help them search for Butters, threatening to tell on them if they do not. A weakened, delirious Butters makes his way to the hospital but his disguise fools the attending doctor, who sends him to the local animal shelter. There, the veterinarian determines that the only thing to do is to put Butters to sleep, but he escapes.

The boys decide to dispose of the evidence and return to the fair to have the vendor refund their money, which he refuses to do. Craig and the others inform them that they have seen Butters wandering around on the other side of the fair towards an auction that all their parents are attending. Cartman decides to use his ninja power of invisibility to walk across the auction stage to get to Butters undetected and takes off his clothes. However, in real life, he inadvertently ends up streaking across the stage.

The final scene shows the townsfolk protesting at an emergency meeting about an outrage at the auction. The boys are under the impression that the outrage in question is Butters' wound (which has been medically treated by this time), but it soon transpires that the real issue is Cartman's public nudity. Cartman explains that it was a "wardrobe malfunction" (a reference to the Super Bowl XXXVIII halftime show controversy that occurred six weeks prior to the episode's airing), and the episode ends with the other three boys addressing the issue that adults are more offended by sex than by violence, allowing them to keep their weapons with Kyle suggesting that Cartman should be punished. The episode ends with a freeze-frame of the boys in anime style posing.

Production
In spite of the episode's popularity among fans, series co-creators Trey Parker and Matt Stone openly admitted in the season eight DVD audio commentary that they did not think it was a very good episode. This episode features some ninja counterparts of the original cast of characters that appears to be modeled after the video game sprites from Capcom's Street Fighter Alpha 3.  "Let's Fighting Love" is a theme song that mixes Japanese and English lyrics in a style parody of anime theme songs including that of Dragon Ball Z. The song is performed by Parker.

Home media
"Good Times with Weapons", along with the thirteen other episodes from South Parks eighth season, was released on a three-disc DVD set in the United States on August 29, 2006. The set includes brief audio commentaries by Parker and Stone for each episode. In 2006, the episode was also included in South Park – The Hits: Volume 1, a DVD compilation which features Parker and Stone's ten favorite episodes. On March 6, 2007, 1 day before the 11th season began, this episode was re-rendered in HD at 16:9 widescreen and was free with purchases of an Xbox 360 console or  HD DVD Drive at Best Buy on a single HD DVD disc from March 20 to April 3. It was also free on the Xbox 360 marketplace for two weeks from March 6 to March 20.

References

External links 

 "Good Times with Weapons" Full episode at South Park Studios
 

Ninja parody
South Park (season 8) episodes
Anime-influenced Western animation
Japan in non-Japanese culture
Fiction about invisibility